The 52nd annual Miss Puerto Rico Universe competition was held in the fall of 2006 in Puerto Rico. Zuleyka Rivera, who won the title of Miss Puerto Rico Universe 2006 who then became Miss Universe 2006, crowned her successor, Uma Blasini of Guayanilla as Miss Puerto Rico Universe 2007. Blasini represented Puerto Rico at Miss Universe 2007 in Mexico City, Mexico.

Results

Contestants

Crossovers
 Miss Guayanilla, Uma Blasini, represented Puerto Rico at Miss Universe 2007 in Mexico City, Mexico where she failed to place in the semi-finals. She previously competed at Miss Puerto Rico Universe 2005 representing San Juan where she finished as 5th runner-up.
 Miss Barceloneta, Melissa Rivera, previously competed at Miss Mundo de Puerto Rico 2003 but did not place as a finalist.
 Miss Barranquitas, Yara Lasanta, previously held the titles of Miss Teen International 2001 and Miss Teen Latina USA 2003. She also competed at Miss Puerto Rico Universe 2005 where she finished as 4th runner-up. Yara later went on to place 2nd runner-up in Univision's Nuestra Belleza Latina 2007 and 1st runner-up at the Miss World Puerto Rico 2009. She later represented Puerto Rico at Miss World 2010 in which she finished in the semi-finals. Prior to the final night, Yara had won the Miss World Beach Beauty competition, which was what guaranteed her a spot in the semi-finals on the final night of the pageant.
 Miss Coamo, Sofía Alvarez, previously placed as one of the ten finalists at Miss Puerto Rico Teen 2003 and 1st runner-up at Elite Model Look 2003 contest.
 Miss Comerío, Tania Rodríguez, previously placed 2nd runner-up at Miss Teen International 2004.
 Miss Santurce, Maria De Lourdes Marino, previously won the contest of La Cara De Imagen L'Oreal 2004.

References

Puerto Rico 2007
2006 in Puerto Rico
2007 beauty pageants